Bieszczady County, a region in Poland
 Bieszczady National Park, a national park in Poland
 Bieszczady Mountains, a mountain range in Poland, Slovakia, and Ukraine
 Bieszczady (yacht), a Polish yacht